The 2016 PSA Annual Awards was organized by the Philippine Sportswriters Association, the oldest media organization based in the Philippines formed by sportswriters from newspapers (broadsheets and tabloids) and sports news websites. PSA is currently helmed by Riera U. Mallari of the Manila Standard. The awards night is co-presented by MVP Sports Foundation, Milo, Philippine Racing Commission, San Miguel Corporation, the Philippine Sports Commission (PSC), the Philippine Olympic Committee (POC), the Philippine Charity Sweepstakes Office, Philippine Basketball Association (PBA), Accel, GlobalPort, Rain or Shine, Maynilad, Smart Communications, ICTSI, the Philippine Amusement and Gaming Corporation, SM Prime Holdings, One Esplanade, National University and Senator Francis Escudero. The awards will be given to the Philippine athletes and organizations who have been recognized for their achievements and victories in 2015, particularly the Filipino gold medalists in the 2015 Southeast Asian Games.

Ceremonies were held at One Esplanade, Pasay on 13 February 2016 at 8 pm and hosted by veteran sportscaster Quinito Henson and Sports5 head Patricia Bermudez-Hizon. Wilfred Steven Uytengsu, who will receive the award as Executive of the Year, was invited to be the event's guest speaker.

Filipino boxing champions Nonito Donaire and Donnie Nietes and Asian Open golf standout Miguel Tabuena will share the trophy as the Athlete of the Year. It is the first time in 3 years that the PSA Athlete of the Year award will give out to multiple athletes.

PSC Chairman Richie Garcia and its commissioners Jolly Gomez, Buddy Andrada, Akiko Thomson-Guevara, and Iggy Clavecilla, POC Executive Director Guillermo Iroy, Jr., POC President Peping Cojuangco, International Olympic Committee representative to the Philippines Mikee Cojuangco-Jaworski, POC 1st Vice President Joey Romasanta and POC Chairman Tom Carrasco are also invited in the ceremonies.

Honor Roll list

Special awards
The following list is the special awards given in the 2016 PSA Annual Awards.

Major citations
The following list is the major citations given to some notable personalities in Philippine sports in 2016.

Minor citations

Tony Siddayao Awards for Under 17 athletes
The award was given to young and exceptional athletes who are under the age of 17 years old. It was named after Tony Siddayao, the former sports editor of Manila Standard.

Posthumous awards
The posthumous awards were given to the Philippines sports personalities who died in 2015. They were given a trophy and a one-minute silence for the honorees.

Ramil Cruz (PBA technical director and assistant coach of UP Fighting Maroons)
Servillano Padiz, Jr. (father of Philippine sepak takraw)
Irineo Federigan (former softball national player)
Henry Cojuangco (former San Miguel Corporation executive)
Jun Castro, Jr. (former PSC commissioner and running enthusiast)
Lim Eng Beng (former PBA and De La Salle Green Archers player)
Arturo Macapagal (played at the 1972 Summer Olympics in Munich)
Ron Jacobs (former Philippines men's national basketball team coach)

See also
2015 in Philippine sports

References

PSA
PSA